Mage's Initiation: Reign of the Elements is a 2019 adventure game created by Himalaya Studios for Windows, Linux, and Mac OS X.

Plot summary
A sixteen year old D'arc was seemingly destined for academical and magical mastery in a secluded tower. But this might all change when tested to find three items: a lock of hair from a powerful Enchantress, the unspoiled shell of Griffon's egg and the three-pronged horn of the legendary Trinicorn. He therefore travels to a forest with goblins, a desert wasteland with bandits, a vast lake with evil beauty and hostile mountain peaks.

Development
On September 21, 2009, the developers announced in a newsletter email that they have "commenced preliminary development" on a new game. They also revealed that it will not be a sequel to Al Emmo, but rather an original project blending adventure and role-playing video game elements:

The game's plot details are currently under wraps, as we still need to sort through some final details. But we can confirm that, based on fan feedback, our forthcoming title will center around a fantasy, pseudo-medieval theme, similar to what Sierra fans have come to expect from the classic King's Quest and Quest for Glory games. Players will also have access to a specific class-based set of actions, with a total of 4 character classes to choose from.

A crowdfunding campaign was run for the project on Kickstarter in early 2013 and raised US$125,174 out of a US$65,000 target.

Reception 

Mage's Initiation: Reign of the Elements received an aggregated score of 70 on Metacritic, indicating mixed or average reviews. Game Critics praised the game's story and worldbuilding, but felt that the combat and mazes were repetitive. Adventure Gamers celebrated the game's art, as well as its writing, dialog and voice acting, but criticized its combat and role-playing game mechanics. GameSpot was similarly positive about the game's art and story, while criticizing its combat and cinematics. PC Invasion described playing the game as "like discovering a lost Sierra title from the VGA generation," but "[a]t it’s worst, it’s a bit of an uninteresting slog."

References

External links
 
 Review at AdventureGamers.com

2019 video games
Adventure games
Adventure Game Studio games
Fantasy video games
Linux games
MacOS games
Point-and-click adventure games
Video games developed in the United States
Windows games